Akola, also known as Chhipo ka Akola, is a village in Bhupalsagar tehsil of Chittorgarh district in the Indian state of Rajasthan. Akola is famous for dabu print. the dabu print is famous on all over india

Location 
It belong to Udaipur division.
It is located 52 km towards west form district headquarters chittorgarh, 13 km from Bhopalsagar, 339 km from state capital Jaipur.
Akola is surrounded by kapasan tehsil towards North, Mavli tehsil towards west, Bhinder tehsil towards south, Railmagra tehsil towards North.

References

Villages in Chittorgarh district